Bilawal Bhutto Zardari (born 21 September 1988) is a Pakistani politician who is serving as the 37th Minister of Foreign Affairs, in office since 27 April 2022. He became the chairman of Pakistan People's Party in 2007, following his mother's assassination. He belongs from the Bhutto family, a prominent political family of Pakistan. He is the son of former Prime Minister Benazir Bhutto and former President Asif Ali Zardari. Bilawal became a member of the National Assembly of Pakistan on 13 August 2018.

Early life and background

Bilawal Bhutto Zardari was born at the Lady Dufferin Hospital in Karachi, Sindh, on 21 September 1988 to former Prime Minister of Pakistan Benazir Bhutto and her husband, former President of Pakistan, Asif Ali Zardari. He is the maternal grandson of former president and Prime Minister of Pakistan, Zulfikar Ali Bhutto and his wife Nusrat Bhutto. His paternal grandfather, Hakim Ali Zardari, was a politician and a member of the National Assembly of Pakistan. From his mother's side, he is the nephew of politicians Murtaza Bhutto and Shahnawaz Bhutto, and from his father's side, his aunts are politicians Azra Peechoho and Faryal Talpur. Politician Ghinwa Bhutto is his aunt by marriage, and poet Fatima Bhutto, is his cousin. 

He is of Sindhi and Kurdish descent on his maternal side and Baloch descent on his paternal side.

For early education, Bilawal attended Karachi Grammar School in Karachi and Froebel's International School in Islamabad before going into exile to Dubai in 1999 along with his mother. In Dubai, he attended the Rashid School For Boys. For further studies, he followed in the footsteps of both his mother and his grandfather and applied to Oxford University, where he was accepted to read Modern History and Politics at Christ Church, receiving his Bachelor of Arts degree in 2012 (later promoted to a Master of Arts by seniority).

Career

Chairman of Pakistan Peoples Party and 2018 general elections 

Bilawal was appointed as the Chairman of Pakistan Peoples Party (PPP), on 30 December 2007, at the age of 19. On this occasion he recalled his martyred mother, "My mother always said that democracy is the best revenge".

On 28 June 2018, PPP, under Bilawal became the first political party to unveil its election manifesto for the 2018 General Elections. This was the 10th manifesto by the party and was titled, Bibi ka Waada Nibhaana Hai Pakistan Bachana Hai (We have to fulfil Benazir's promise and save Pakistan). At an event unveiling the manifesto, Bilawal said that if given the opportunity, the party would focus on implementing a poverty eradication programme. PPP kicked off its election campaign on 30 June 2018, as Bilawal inaugurated their election office in Lyari, Karachi.

In the Pakistan general elections held on 25 July 2018, Pakistan Peoples Party, under the leadership of Bilawal, contested the elections and emerged as the largest party in Sindh and third largest party of Pakistan. The party won 43 seats in the National Assembly - nine more seats than in the 2013 General Elections. Bilawal contested from Karachi District South (NA-246), Malakand (NA-8), as well as Larkana (NA-200). He won from Larkana with 84,426 votes, having lost from two of the other constituencies to the Imran Khan-founded Pakistan Tehreek-e-Insaf (PTI) candidates.

The PPP scion claimed that rigging took place before and after the elections, adding that across Pakistan polling agents were expelled from the polling stations. "We are a part of the parliament to support the democratic we will ignore the discrepancies in the election," he remarked, demanding a probe into rigging allegations.

Member of the National Assembly
On 13 August 2018, Bilawal became a member of the National Assembly of Pakistan. Journalists, politicians, and the people of Pakistan praised Bilawal after he delivered his maiden speech in the parliament. In his speech, he asked Imran Khan to fulfil his promise of rooting out corruption, resolving the water crisis, and providing ten million jobs and 5 million houses to the people during his tenure. In the speech, Bilawal coined the term 'PM Select' for Imran Khan. He also said that Imran Khan is not only the prime minister for his party but he is also the prime minister of the Pakistani people who he used refer to as 'donkeys' and 'living corpses' before becoming the Prime Minister.

Committee for Human Rights 
On 5 March 2019, Bilawal was elected – unopposed - as the chairperson of the National Assembly Standing Committee for Human Rights. In its first meeting on 18 April 2019, the committee deliberated on The ICT Rights of Persons with Disability Bill, 2018, moved by the ministry and The National Commission on the Status of Women (Amendment) Bill, 2018.

Foreign Minister of Pakistan 
On 27 April 2022, he sworn in as Foreign Minister of Pakistan. President Arif Alvi took his oath. He became the youngest foreign minister of Pakistan.

On 21 May 2022, Foreign Minister Bilawal Bhutto Zardari held talks with his Chinese counterpart Wang Yi in Guangzhou to push Pakistan-China relations to a new height, declaring, 'Any Attack on China is an Attack on Pakistan'.

On 30 January 2023, Bilawal arrived Moscow on an official visit during severe economic crisis in Pakistan.

Political activism

Support for 18th Amendment
Bilawal has repeatedly criticized the One Unit system and warned against any attempt to bring in the presidential system, explaining that it will not be in the interest of democracy. During a press talk at a conference on 27 April 2019, he stated, "Presidential system is neither in the interest of the country nor the federation and all democratic forces will resist any such move," adding that the presidential form of government had failed wherever it had been enforced. "There is no provision in our laws for conducting a referendum."

Freedom of expression 
A devout advocate for democracy, Bilawal has repeatedly denounced censorship and likened any forms of curbing media freedom to living under a dictatorship. He made a speech at the Karachi Press Club on World Press Freedom Day where he said, "An undeclared censorship is stifling the freedom of expression in Pakistan and journalists are coming under threat from state and non-state actors." He added, "Journalists and media persons as human rights defenders suffer the most when freedom of expression is stifled. After the right to life, the most important right is the right of expression and the freedom of association because all other rights cannot even be articulated without it."

During the speech, he also criticized the Prevention of Electronic Crime Act 2016 and stated that it had been misapplied to stifle dissent.

Women's rights 
Bilawal is a strong advocate of "peaceful, progressive, prosperous, democratic Pakistan", what he calls his mother's vision. In an interview with the BBC, he said that his 2018 election campaign was to implement these principles. He is a strong supporter of women's empowerment and believes in empowering women and taking them on board in all matters is the sole guarantee of the country's progress.

On the occasion of International Day of the Girl Child, the PPP chairman said that a future based on progress and prosperity could remain a dream without empowering girls and taking them on board in all matters. Bilawal acknowledged all those women who stepped forward in all sections of life and field while defeating many impediments at every level and social taboos. He specifically named Fatima Jinnah, Benazir Bhutto, Asma Jehangir, and Maryam Mukhtar.

On 17 March 2019, Bilawal met with a delegation of women's rights activists led by Sheema Kirmani and assured his support for their cause. A statement released by Bilawal House later said that his party would not tolerate any offence against the struggle for gender equality and women's rights. The statement went further to read, "The PPP chairman extended his enduring support to the members of the Aurat March and its activists who are struggling for their genuine and legitimate rights as enshrined in the unanimous constitution of Pakistan."

Bilawal has also advocated for the abolishment of child marriages in Pakistan. The Sindh government under PPP abolished child marriages by making the legal marriage age eighteen years in the province under the Sindh Child Marriages Restraint Act, 2013. He as a member of the opposition in the National Assembly has also advocated that the legal marriage age should be made eighteen years across the country. On 4 May 2019 he tweeted, "UAE marriage age is 18, Indonesia is 18, and Turkey is also 18. Are they not Muslim countries? In Sindh where marriage age is 18, we saw how law stopped an adult marrying a 10-year-old! Every 20 minutes a girl dies in Pakistan as a result of underage pregnancy. #EndChildMarriage."

Civil rights 
Bilawal has repeatedly defended the rights of minorities in Pakistan. On 4 December 2012, in a statement responding to reports about the demolition of a Hindu temple in Karachi and a desecration of an Ahmadia graveyard in Lahore he said, "Our forefathers did not sacrifice their lives for an intolerant, extremist, sectarian, and authoritarian Pakistan. I appeal to all of you to rise up and defend Jinnah's Pakistan. My party and I will stand by you, shoulder to shoulder."

During a cake cutting ceremony for Christmas in Karachi, on 25 December 2018, Bilawal said, the PPP is the custodian of social justice, parity, religious, and interfaith harmony in the country and its advocacy for the prevalence of peace and tranquility across the world is heavily established.

At the memorial for the 7th death anniversary of former Federal Minister of Interfaith Harmony, Shahbaz Bhatti on 3 March 2018, Bilawal said, "May I take this opportunity to say that we share the concerns over the misuse of blasphemy laws. This is the concern of not only the Christian community but of all of us. It is my concern too. These laws have been used as a tool by extremists to settle personal scores. They have been used to grab the properties of Christians and other non-Muslims. The blasphemy laws carry the mandatory death penalty. We must prevent their misuse. We will."

On 29 September 2019, he visited the Hindus in Ghotki and the Sacho Satram Dham temple which was desecrated in the 2019 Ghotki riots and condemned the attack.

Foreign policy
On 20 September 2014, while speaking to party workers in Multan, Bilawal said, "I will take back Kashmir, all of it, and I will not leave behind a single inch of it because, like the other provinces, it belongs to Pakistan." The statement was to be the first marking his stance on the Kashmir issue and remarked upon widely in local and international media. 

On 6 February 2019, Bilawal met with the Kashmir Council in Washington to express solidarity with the people of Kashmir. During the meeting, he assured the delegation that he would continue to raise his voice against the brutalities of Indian forces against innocent and unarmed Kashmiri people at every available forum both nationally and internationally. He said that loyalty to the cause of Kashmir was in his blood and he would stand with the people of Indian-administered Kashmir in their just struggle for the right to self-determination and freedom from illegal and immoral Indian occupation.

On 15 October 2022, after U.S. President Joe Biden referred to Pakistan as "one of the most dangerous nations in the world" and as a carrier of "nuclear weapons without any cohesion" at a Democratic Party fundraiser in California, Bilawal summoned American diplomat Donald Blome to the Ministry of Foreign Affairs and demanded an explanation as well as called for an official démarche.

Terrorism 
On 18 February 2018, while addressing a function in Washington, Bilawal said that there is a growing increase in terrorism in Pakistan and that democracy can win over extremism, but the biggest battle is of ideologies. "The battle is between modernity and extremism."

Bilawal has also repeatedly criticized the government's resistance to implementing the National Action Plan, which he deems resistance to democracy and peace in the nation. He has also demanded the removal of three federal ministers accusing them of having connections with banned militant outfits. On 7 March 2019, during a provincial council meeting, Bilawal said, "I demand a joint parliamentary committee for implementation of National Action Plan and removal of all three federal ministers for their connection with extremist organisations. If our demands are not met, we will not support the government anymore."

Summoned in Fake Accounts & Money Laundering case
On 11 February 2020, Bilawal was summoned for a third time by the National Accountability Bureau to give a statement in a fake bank accounts and money laundering case. The Bureau said that Bilawal had stated that he was unaware of the management affairs of Zardari Group Private Limited (ZPGL). But it was revealed that he had signed the audited accounts of the ZGPL for the years 2011 - 2016 as the CEO and submitted them to the Federal Board of Revenue thus negating his claim he had not been running the affairs of the ZGPL.

References

External links 

1988 births
Living people
Alumni of Christ Church, Oxford
Bhutto family
Children of national leaders
Children of presidents of Pakistan
Children of prime ministers of Pakistan
Foreign Ministers of Pakistan
Karachi Grammar School alumni
Leaders of political parties in Pakistan
Pakistan People's Party MNAs
Pakistani expatriates in England
Pakistani expatriates in the United Arab Emirates
Pakistani MNAs 2018–2023
Pakistani people of Iranian descent
Pakistani people of Iraqi descent
Pakistani people of Kurdish descent
Politicians from Karachi
Rashid School for Boys alumni
Bilawal
Corruption in Pakistan